O Song-suk (born 2 September 1977) is a North Korean long-distance runner who competes in the marathon. Her personal best time is 2:31:14 hours, achieved in April 2002 in Pyongyang.

She finished 23rd in the marathon at the 2005 World Championships. She also won the 2004 Pyongyang Marathon.

She was the silver medallist at the 2003 Military World Games.

Achievements
All results regarding marathon, unless stated otherwise

References

1977 births
Living people
North Korean female marathon runners
North Korean female long-distance runners
20th-century North Korean women
21st-century North Korean women